Scott Free Productions is an  independent film and television production company founded in 1970 by filmmakers and brothers Ridley Scott and Tony Scott. They formed the feature film development company Percy Main Productions in 1980, naming the company after the English village Percy Main, where their father grew up. The company was renamed Scott Free Productions in 1995. Scott Free has produced films ranging from the 2000 Hollywood blockbuster Gladiator (2000) to "smaller pictures" like Cracks (2009). Between the productions of White Squall (1996) and G.I. Jane (1997), Ridley Scott reorganised the company.

Scott Free Productions has offices in London and Los Angeles. It works with Ridley Scott's larger company RSA Films by assisting directors in film and television.

History 
On July 1, 1992, Percy Main Productions signed a production deal with Paramount Pictures to produce its feature films.

On December 6, 1993, two separate production companies Tony Scott Productions and Percy Main Productions was merged into a single roof and it signed an agreement with 20th Century Fox, and Italy's RCS Video, with UK's Majestic Films International to distribute its films and made its new banner Scott Free Productions.

On September 25, 1995, the Scotts moved to Disney, and Largo Entertainment took over international distribution of its product. In 1996, the Scotts signed a secondary agreement with Intermedia to finance some of its films.

In November 1997, the Scotts moved full-time to PolyGram Filmed Entertainment, where they produced feature films for the studio, terminating its contracts with Disney and Intermedia.

On October 12, 1999, Scott Free Productions entered a two-year production deal with The Walt Disney Studios and Jerry Bruckheimer Films, after its original deal with Universal, which was inherited from PolyGram Filmed Entertainment ended. There, the company produced Black Hawk Down for Bruckheimer.

On September 21, 2001, Scott Free was moved to 20th Century Fox, and Fox produced its feature films, after its previous agreement with producer Jerry Bruckheimer ended. After Disney's acquisition of 21st Century Fox on March 20, 2019 and Disney dropped the “Fox” name from the studio's 20th Century Fox and Fox Searchlight Pictures branding and the two studios were renamed 20th Century Studios and Searchlight Pictures, respectively on January 17, 2020, Scott Free returned to Disney.

On November 6, 2002, Scott Free signed a television contract with CBS to produce its television shows, airing on the network.

On January 23, 2005, Numbers became Scott Free's first hit series for television. The strategy repeated on September 22, 2009 when Scott Free produced its second hit series The Good Wife.

On August 21, 2012, Tony Scott, who was one of the co-founders of the company in 1993, died.

During February 2023, ABC News studios announced they have signed with Scott Free to produce a four part true-crime docuseries for Hulu.

Production logo
As of Clay Pigeons, released in 1998, the production logo is a watercolour animation of a crudely-drawn man wearing monk-style clothing with a white haze surrounding him, walking and smoking a cigarette, him running and transforming into a bird. The company name (sometimes since A Good Year in 2006, without it) appears underneath the bird and everything turns blue and on a black background. The bird is between the name. It was done by Italian artist and animator Gianluigi Toccafondo.

Productions

References

External links 
 

 
 
Film production companies of the United Kingdom
Film production companies of the United States
Companies based in London
Companies based in Los Angeles
Companies based in West Hollywood, California
Scott family (filmmaking)
American independent film studios